Death Gate is an adventure game loosely based on Margaret Weis and Tracy Hickman's fantasy book series The Death Gate Cycle. Legend Entertainment released it for MS-DOS compatible operating systems in 1994. It received several awards. The box cover is the painting that Keith Parkinson created for the third book, Fire Sea.

GOG.com released an emulated version for Microsoft Windows, macOS, and Linux in January 2018. It was removed from sale two months later.

Plot

The player takes the role of Haplo and starts in the Nexus with Lord Xar. Lord Xar tasks Haplo to visit the four worlds, Arianus, Pryan, Abarrach and Chelestra and retrieve the seal pieces of these worlds. Xar plans to undo the Sundering with the Reformation, the act of recreating the Earth again and he needs the seal pieces to do so. To travel to the other worlds, Haplo is given a ship with a magical steering stone. If the symbol of a world is magically engraved on it, the ship can travel to that world through the Death Gate. Xar gives Haplo the symbol of Arianus, the realm of air, and Haplo sets sail.

Arianus

Haplo arrives on the lower realm of Arianus, inhabited by dwarves. A dwarf called Limbeck studies a machine called the Kicksey-winsey. Glowing figures try to get the Kicksey-winsey to work. According to the dwarves they are gods. Haplo manages to get aboard the ship of the gods and finds out they are elves. He finds human slaves that operate the ship. One of them is the cousin of the human king, King Stephen. Haplo brings a message to King Stephen and returns to the elven ship. He manages to break the glowing spell of the elves. The dwarves expel the elves and the elven ship leaves. Haplo manages to lure it into a human ambush and the slaves are rescued. On his search for the seal piece, Haplo goes to Skurvash, a smuggler's den. He manages to catch the attention of Hugh the Hand and infiltrates the Brotherhood. In their tower he finds an artifact of Sartan origin as well as a manual to the Kicksey-winsey and the book of Pryan. He returns to the Kicksey-winsey, fixes it and uses it to dig a tunnel to a secret chamber. Inside he finds crystal coffins with Sartan. All are dead. Haplo manages to find the seal piece of Arianus in the chamber. He returns to the Nexus and hands Xar the seal piece. Xar then sends Haplo to Pryan, the realm of Fire. Haplo transfers Pryan's symbol from the book onto the steering stone and ventures through the Death Gate.

Pryan

Haplo lands near a huge citadel but can't enter. In the forest he encounters giant creatures called . Being stuck he sets sail to a city he had seen. He encounters elves. He meets a group of elven and human children, including the elven prince. They take him to one of their secret meetings with a wizard called Zifnab. Haplo follows Zifnab. He meets Zifnab and his dragon. Zifnab seems to be a crazy wizard but Haplo learns that Zifnab is a Sartan. Zifnab senses that Haplo is very important even though he is a Patryn. Inside the Citadel is the seal piece of Pryan. But the Citadel is closed and can only be opened by the mensch with three specific objects, a golden staff, a golden sword and a golden hammer. The golden sword is carried by the human leader and is currently in hands of the human princess. The golden staff had been given to the elves but one king tossed it into a giant crevice known as the 'Maw'. The golden hammer is in possession of the dwarves. Haplo needs the humans, elves and dwarves to use their golden items to open the citadel. But he also needs to distract the  who seem to worship a crystal fragment and have forgotten about their tasks for the citadel. Zifnab also tells Haplo of the Wave, the balance of the universe and that his dragon was created by the Wave trying to restore the balance, in response to something very evil that happened a long time ago. He gives Haplo a stone that will glow when he will encounter this evil and tells Haplo to crush the stone when that happens. Haplo retrieves the golden staff and convinces the human princess and the elven prince to accompany him to the Citadel. The girls tells him that the hammer is stashed in the vault and that the vault is only opened when the dwarves go to war. Haplo tosses it into the dwarven tunnels and the  start attacking it. The dwarven girl obtains the hammer and the mensch open the Citadel and the  take their place. Zifnab allows Haplo to take the seal piece even though he knows that Lord Xar wants to conquer the realms and rid it of the Sartan. Haplo returns to the Nexus and delivers the seal piece to Xar who sends Haplo to Abarrach, the realm of Earth. On the crystal fragment, Haplo finds the symbol of Abarrach and transfers it to his steering stone.

Abarrach

Haplo arrives in a deserted city populated by undead Sartan. He manages to find the journal of Balthazar, a royal necromancer and learns the location of the palace of the dynasty of Abarrach. Haplo visits this dynast, Kleitus the XIV. Kleitus senses that Haplo is a Patryn and poisons him. Haplo is thrown into a dungeon where he meets Edmund, a Sartan prince, who is poisoned as well. By possessing the dog of Kleitus, Haplo manages to get the antidote and the keys to their chains and they escape. Edmund takes Haplo to his people and he meets Balthazar in the refugee caves. Balthazar tells him that the mensch perished a long time ago and the Sartan are slowly being extinct by what they call 'The Plague'. Haplo finds a secret tunnel and has a vision of the time of Kleitus I. He also finds a book which condemns necromancy. For every resurrected dead Sartan, one dies an untimely death. The practice of necromancy is the source of the Plague and responsible for killing the Sartan on Arianus. Haplo also learns that Kleitus I has sabotaged the Colossus, which channels the energy of Abarrach and used a part of it to make him a powerful scepter that can kill anyone instantly. Haplo manages to return to the palace, find and fix the Colossus and Kleitus XIV is killed by Edmund. Edmund realized that Haplo is a Patryn, but sees him as a friend since Haplo helped him and his people. He gives Haplo an amulet out of gratitude. The amulet contains the symbols of the five realms, Arianus, Pryan, Abarrach, Chelestra and the Nexus. Haplo retrieves the seal piece of Arianus from the secret room of the Colossus and returns to the Nexus. Xar hastily sends Haplo to Chelestra, the realm of Water. Haplo transfers the symbol of Chelestra from the amulet to the steering stone and heads off.

Chelestra

Haplo arrives near a Sartan city that is warded by a powerful shield spell. He also finds a cave and his stone glows faintly. Unspeakable terror prohibits from entering. He neutralizes the ward of the Sartan city and is attacked by Sang-Drax, who appears a black winged dragon with red eyes. Sang-Drax tosses the stone away, being afraid of it. Haplo is terrified and nearly can't move. Just before Sang-Drax burns his body, he transfers his soul to the dog, that has been following him since Abarrach and escapes into the city. Haplo's body is restored with his soul by Samah, the Sartan that lead the council that destroyed the world. Sang-Drax enters the now unshielded city and steals the final seal piece and changes his form to Haplo and leaves. Samah tells him that Sang-Drax will try to make Xar proceed with the Reformation. The Reformation will result in the death of the mensch, Sartan and Patryns, and have catastrophic consequences. Samah tells Haplo that the Interconnection must be done. The realms will align and function according to the old Sartan plan. Pryan will generate power for all realms, Abarrach will supply raw materials for the Kicksey-winsey, the Kicksey-winsey will use the raw materials to make tools and materials for all worlds and Chelestra will supply water to the worlds. All this is done through the Death Gate. They give Haplo a Sartan ship without a steering stone. Haplo manages to find a substitute and transfers the symbols from the amulet on to it. He retrieves the stone and returns to the Nexus.

The Nexus & the Labyrinth

Haplo finds Xar and the Nexus seal piece gone. He follows them through the Labyrinth, encountering a Patryn village that is under attack. He manages to find a cave. He encounters Sang-Drax again. He drinks nullifying water, which nullifies his magical abilities. That makes him immune to all kinds of magic, including Sang-Drax's aura of terror but also prohibits Haplo from casting magic. He breaks Zifnab's stone and Zifnab and his dragon appear. The dragon fights Sang-Drax and both are injured. Zifnab, Haplo and the dragon follow Sang-Drax to the Vortex, the place where the Sundering had been initiated. Haplo finds Xar and Sang-Drax and convinces Xar to start the Interconnection. Sang-drax kills Xar before he can do so. Haplo figures out how to start the Interconnection himself and does so. Sang-Drax is defeated and the realms are properly aligned.

Characters

Haplo: Haplo is the main character and controlled by the player. He is a Patryn and is commanded by his Lord Xar to find the four seal pieces of the realms Arianus, Pryan, Abarrach and Chelestra. Unlike the book, Haplo has no dog as a companion until he reaches Abarrach, where he finds the dog of Kleitus. In the book Haplo had a dog as a companion from the beginning. Also Haplo isn't nearly as powerful as in the books, probably due to gameplay reasons. He can be easily killed by some mensch if you make the wrong choices.
Lord Xar: Xar is the most powerful Patryn, the first Patryn to escape the Labyrinth and Lord of the Nexus. He is intended to take revenge on the Sartan. He wants to five seal pieces of the five realms to bring about the Reformation which is supposed to restore the Earth to its former form and undo the Sundering. He intends to rule all the mensch. Like the character from the books he is dedicated and determined to destroy the Sartan. In the game, he is far more easily convinced not to proceed with the Reformation though.
Zifnab: Just as in the book, Zifnab appears as a crazy wizard. Zifnab is important, explaining a lot about the workings of the Citadels and giving Haplo the stone to combat true evil. He later returns with his dragon to fight Sang-Drax and save Haplo so that Haplo can bring about the Interconnection. The game makes no connection however between Zifnab and the Labyrinth and the books found in the Nexus. His dragon also seems to be the only one of its kind.
Sang-Drax: Sang-Drax is portrayed as a winged dragon, rather than a serpent. Unlike the books he is also the only one of his kind and his origins are never really explained. In the books the serpents are the embodiment of Evil, which were given form by the Sundering. In the game Zifnab simply states that at one point something very evil was created and that his dragon was created in response.

Release
The game was released with a short story called "Forever Falling" written by Weis and Hickman with Kevin Stein. It tells the story of how Ciang became the Head of the Brotherhood of the Hand, an assassins' guild featured in both the books and the game. The story serves as backstory to events in The Death Gate Cycle and has little relation to Death Gate.

Reception

In PC Gamer US, Trent C. Ward wrote, "Players who're used to the visual charms of a King's Quest or a Noctropolis may find this a tough game to get interested in. But if your only concern is for substance, then Death Gates a winner." He declared it the best Legend "text-and-pictures" adventure released up to that point.

Computer Gaming World nominated Death Gate as its 1994 "Adventure of the Year", although it lost to Relentless: Twinsen's Adventure. The editors wrote of Death Gate, "The quality of the puzzles is evident, but Death Gate also uses compelling atmospheric graphics to distinguish its numerous imaginary worlds."

Awards
 1994 Strategy Plus Animated Adventure Game of the Year Award (Runner-up)
 1994 Computer Game Review Golden Triad Award
 1994 Interactive Gaming Editor's Choice Award
 1995 Games Magazine Top 100 Electronic Games of the Year Award

Reviews
White Wolf Inphobia #55 (May, 1995)

References

External links
 
 Death Gate at Mr. Bill's Adventureland
 Death Gate — comparing the game and the original book series in detail

1994 video games
Adventure games
DOS games
Linux games
MacOS games
Piko Interactive games
Point-and-click adventure games
Single-player video games
Video games based on novels
Video games developed in the United States
Windows games
Legend Entertainment games